Bujan is a village and a former municipality in the Kukës County, northern Albania. At the 2015 local government reform it became a subdivision of the municipality Tropojë. The population at the 2011 census was 2,550. It is known for hosting the 1943 Bujan Conference.

Notable people
Mic Sokoli, People's Hero of Albania
Tahir Sinani (1964-2001), Albanian KLA and NLA fighter
Binak Alia (1805-1890), leader of the Revolt of 1845, participant in the League of Prizren
Sokol Rama, leader of the Revolt of 1845

References

Former municipalities in Kukës County
Administrative units of Tropojë
Villages in Kukës County